Chuck Marohnic is an American jazz pianist and educator, known for his association with Chet Baker. He was the director of jazz studies at Arizona State University from 1981 to 2003 and has published several jazz instruction books in addition to recording.

Discography
 Copenhagen Suite (Steeplechase, 1979)
 Permutations (Steeplechase, 1981)
 Pages of Stone (ITM Pacific, 1991)
 Now Alone (ITM Pacific, 1991)
 Many Mansions (A Records, 1998)
 Jazz! (Summit, 1998)
 White Men Can't Monk (Summit, 2001)
 Trios (CDBaby, 2006)

References

American jazz pianists
American male pianists
Living people
Arizona State University faculty
Year of birth missing (living people)
21st-century American pianists
21st-century American male musicians
American male jazz musicians